Kevin Alan McDonald (born 26 June 1985 in Newcastle upon Tyne) is an English former professional footballer, coach, and current assistant manager of Kelty Hearts.

Club career
McDonald signed for Hibernian from Sunderland and made his senior debut on the final day of the 2003–04 season. He was loaned to Clyde for six months in 2006 and he then spent the 2006–07 season on loan at Airdrie United. McDonald was released by Hibs in 2007 and he then signed permanently for Airdrie. In June 2010 he moved onto Alloa Athletic.

McDonald signed for Junior side Bonnyrigg Rose Athletic in June 2013.

Coaching 
McDonald later signed for Musselburgh Athletic in 2014, where he would retire as a player and take up the assistant managers job at the club. He was appointed as permanent manager replacing Calvin Shand on 18 March 2019.

McDonald would join brother in law Kevin Thomson as his assistant at Kelty Hearts on 29 May 2021.

See also
Clyde F.C. season 2005-06

Honours
Airdrie United
Scottish Challenge Cup: 2008–09

References

External links

1985 births
Living people
Footballers from Newcastle upon Tyne
English footballers
Association football midfielders
Hibernian F.C. players
Clyde F.C. players
Airdrieonians F.C. players
Alloa Athletic F.C. players
Berwick Rangers F.C. players
Bonnyrigg Rose Athletic F.C. players
Scottish Premier League players
Scottish Football League players
Scottish Junior Football Association players
Wallsend Boys Club players